The Rooseum Center for Contemporary Art was a formally private-owned (though publicly funded) centre for contemporary art  located in Malmö, Sweden.

Founded in 1988 by the Swedish art collector and financier Fredrik Roos (1951-1991),  Rooseum began as a traditional exhibition hall showing modern and contemporary art from the Nordic countries and internationally. Under the first director, Lars Nittve, it established an international reputation. With the arrival of Charles Esche in 2000, Rooseum promoted more experimental relationships between art, artists and audience, by offering exhibitions and commissions linked to seminars, discussions and relevant screenings. It became one of the main sites of the artistic discussion around 'New institutionalism'. Rooseum, which was housed in a former power station built in 1900 at Gasverksgatan 22, closed in 2006.

The Museum of Modern Art in Stockholm (Moderna Museet) opened a satellite location, Moderna Museet Malmö, in the premises of the former Rooseum in 2009. The Moderna Museet Malmö exhibits both its collection and temporary contemporary art exhibitions.

References

External links
Rooseum website

Art museums and galleries in Sweden
Buildings and structures in Malmö
Art galleries established in 1988
Art galleries disestablished in 2006
Defunct art museums and galleries
1988 establishments in Sweden
2006 disestablishments in Sweden
Museums in Skåne County